Alex Bangura (born 13 July 1999) is a Sierra Leonean footballer who plays as a left-back or a winger for Eredivisie club SC Cambuur and the Sierra Leone national team.

Club career
After playing for DRL and Feyenoord at youth level, Bangura made his debut for SC Cambuur on 4 February 2019 away to Jong AZ.

International career
Born in Sierra Leone, he also holds Dutch citizenship. He debuted for the Sierra Leone national team in a friendly 3–0 loss to Togo on 24 March 2022.

References

External links
 Career stats - Voetbal International
 
 

1999 births
Living people
Sierra Leonean footballers
Sierra Leone international footballers
Dutch footballers
Sierra Leonean emigrants to the Netherlands
Dutch people of Sierra Leonean descent
Naturalised citizens of the Netherlands
Association football wingers
SC Cambuur players
SC Feyenoord players
Feyenoord players
Eerste Divisie players
Eredivisie players
Dutch sportspeople of African descent